The National Agency for Fiscal Administration (ANAF) is the revenue service of the Romanian government.

Part of the Ministry of Public Finance, ANAF was established in 2003 and became operational the following year.

References

External links 
 Official site

Taxation in Romania
2003 establishments in Romania
Government agencies established in 2003
Revenue services
Government agencies of Romania